Dichong Station is an elevated station of Line 4 of the Guangzhou Metro. It started operations on 30 December 2006. It is located at the junction of Nande Road and Qianqing Road in Shiqi Town, Panyu District.

Station layout

Exits

References

Guangzhou Metro stations in Panyu District
Railway stations in China opened in 2006